Charlie Allan (born 27 February 1963) is a Scottish actor and musician. He is the Chief Executive of The Clanranald Trust for Scotland, a recognized non-profit organization in Scotland, which would spread and revive primarily Scottish culture and Scottish heritage through entertainment and education. For this purpose, a replica of a medieval Scottish village named Duncarron has been constructed.

He is the founder of the Scottish band Saor Patrol.

He is the Chief of Combat International and the Scottish Federation of Medieval Martial Arts (SFMMA), Combat International and the SFMMA are parts of The Clanranald Trust for Scotland.  He played small roles in films such as Gladiator and Robin Hood. Since making Gladiator he is friends with Russell Crowe, who supports him in his Duncarron project.

Allan was previously married to Malin Heen, with whom he had five children. He has subsequently remarried. In September 2022, Heen was found not guilty at Falkirk sheriff court of embezzling £47,000 from the Clanranald Trust, of which she was formerly an employee.

In June 2012, Allan was hospitalised after being assaulted by two men shortly before he was due to play a concert at a hotel in Stirling. The beating was allegedly carried out by members of the Blue Angels Motorcycle Club, who accused Allan of helping the rival Outlaws Motorcycle Club establish a chapter in Dundee the previous year. Allan subsequently distanced himself from the Outlaws and withdrew from a scheduled appearance at a rock and blues event organised by the motorcycle club in Derby the following month. He said of the incident: "The attack was frightening and left me quite traumatised".

References

External links

 The Clanranald Trust for Scotland website
 Saor Patrol website

1963 births
Scottish bagpipe players
Living people
Scottish male film actors
Place of birth missing (living people)